Warwick Records is the name of:

An American record label, Warwick Records (United States)
A British record label, Warwick Records (United Kingdom)